M/V Sam Laud is a diesel-powered Lake freighter owned and operated by the American Steamship Company. This vessel was built in 1975 at Bay Shipbuilding Company, Sturgeon Bay, Wisconsin and included self-unloading technology.

History 
The ship was built for American Steamship in 1975 and named for GATX's former chairman, Sam Laud (1896-1963). GATX had just acquired American Steamship in 1973.  In service as of 02/14/2022. The ship can be briefly seen during the opening credits for the 1989 film Major League.

References

External links 
 

1975 ships
Great Lakes freighters
Ships built in Sturgeon Bay, Wisconsin